Superettan (meaning the super first (division)) is an association football league and the second highest league in the league system of Swedish men's football. Contested by 16 clubs, it operates on a system of promotion and relegation with Allsvenskan and Division 1. Seasons run from April to October, with teams playing 30 matches each, totalling 240 matches in the season.

The league was created in 2000. The second tier of Swedish football had previously consisted of a varying number of regionalized leagues operating under the Division 2 (1924–1986) and Division 1 (1987–1999) names.

Competition format 
There are 16 clubs in Superettan. During the course of a season (starting in April and ending in October) each club plays the other twice, once at their home stadium and once at that of their opponents, for a total of 30 games. At the end of each season the two lowest placed teams are relegated to Division 1 and the two winning teams from the two Division 1 leagues are promoted in their place while the third and fourth lowest teams in Superettan play a promotion/relegation play-off against the two-second placed teams in Division 1. The top two teams in Superettan are promoted to Allsvenskan and the two lowest placed teams from Allsvenskan are relegated in their place. The third placed team in Superettan plays a promotion/relegation play-off against the third lowest team in Allsvenskan.

Television
The Swiss corporation Kentaro has owned the TV rights for Superettan since 2006. Through license agreements with the media company TV4 Group matches are aired on TV4 Sport who will broadcast a total of 90 matches in 2013 with the remaining 150 games available as online pay per view. The current license agreement is valid from 2011 to 2015.

On March 24, 2017, Discovery-owned broadcaster Eurosport will be the new domestic broadcaster for both SEF competitions (Allsvenskan and Superettan) effectively from 2020 until 2025.

Current clubs (2023 season)

Stadia and locations

 1 Correct as of end of 2019 season

Managers

The current managers in Superettan are:

Statistics

Previous winners

Top goalscorers

Top assists

Top goalkeepers

(Minimum of 10 games played)

Attendance

Superettan had an average attendance of 1,632 during its most recent season (2019). The highest attendance ever recorded at a Superettan match is 31,074 (Hammarby vs Ljungskile in 2014).

The league's best season attendance-wise was 2014 when Hammarby's average attendance reached a level that was extraordinary for Superettan.

Club attendance

See also 
 Sports attendances
 Allsvenskan

References

External links 

 Swedish Football Association – Superettan

 
2
Sports leagues established in 2000
2000 establishments in Sweden
Swedish Professional Football Leagues
Sweden
Professional sports leagues in Sweden
Summer association football leagues